James Edward Ringer (born 18 January 1976) is a retired Wales international rugby union player. He is currently the defensive coach for Merthyr RFC and Sales Director for Cornerstone Commercial Finance.

Domestic career
A flanker, capable of playing both blind and open-side, he started playing in the Welsh premiership for Cardiff RFC at the age of 19. Ringer moved to Bridgend RFC in 1999 before joining Neath RFC in 2002. Ringer's time at Neath was short as he joined Newport Gwent Dragons in 2003. During his time with the region he gained over 100 caps and scored 7 tries. In May 2009 he rejoined Cardiff RFC as a player-coach. He continued playing semi professionally until retiring in 2013, aged 37.

International career
Ringer earned youth caps for Wales U18s, U19s and U21s. He also won caps for Wales 'A' and Wales 7s. Full international caps were hard to come by due to the prevalence of Welsh flankers at the time, including captain Martyn Williams. Ringer's only chance came on the 2001 summer tour to Japan. The British & Irish Lions were on tour in Australia at the time and several key Wales players, including Martyn Williams, were unavailable. Ringer played twice against Japan. On debut Ringer won an assist by passing to Jamie Robinson before he scored. Wales won both tests of the tour.

Family
Ringer is the son of Welsh international rugby union flanker Paul Ringer. And brother of rugby union prop, Joel Bennett Ringer.

References

External links
Newport Gwent Dragons profile

1976 births
Living people
Bridgend RFC players
Cardiff RFC players
Dragons RFC players
Neath RFC players
Penarth RFC players
People educated at St Cyres Comprehensive School
Rugby union flankers
Rugby union players from Cardiff
Wales international rugby union players
Welsh rugby union players